Mariner High School can refer to two different schools:

Mariner High School (Cape Coral, Florida)
Mariner High School (Everett, Washington)